Remnants of Deprivation is the first studio album from Swedish death metal band Visceral Bleeding. It was remastered and re-released along with three bonus tracks under the title "Remnants Revived" in 2005.

Track listing

"Spreader of Disease (Burn the Bitch)" - 3:42
"Carved Down to the Bone" - 2:48
"Gasping..." - 3:13
"Remnants of Deprivation" - 3:02
"State of Putrefaction" - 3:05
"To Disgrace Condemned" - 2:33
"Time to Retaliate" - 2:20
"Butcher Knife Impalement" - 2:59
"Explosive Surgery" - 2:50

Line-Up
Niklas Dewerud - Drums
Peter Persson - Guitar
Marcus Nilsson - Lead Guitar
Calle Löfgren - Bass
Dennis Röndum - Vocals

Visceral Bleeding albums
2002 albums